The 1992 United States presidential election in California took place on November 3, 1992, and was part of the 1992 United States presidential election. Voters chose 54 representatives, or electors to the Electoral College, who voted for president and vice president.

California voted for Democratic presidential candidate Bill Clinton. His victory marked the first time the Golden State had voted for a Democratic presidential nominee since Lyndon B. Johnson’s 1964 landslide, and only the second time since 1948. This would also be the first time since 1932 that a non-incumbent Democrat won California. Clinton's win in this state reflected the change in its status from a Republican-leaning swing state to a Democratic stronghold. California maintains the largest number of electoral votes in the Electoral College.

It was the first occasion that San Diego County had voted for a Democrat since Franklin D. Roosevelt in 1944, and the last time that any of the following counties have given a plurality to the Democratic nominee: Del Norte, Mariposa, Plumas, Siskiyou, Tehama, and Tuolumne. Ross Perot gained a plurality in Trinity County, the only time a third-party candidate has carried any county in the state since Progressive Party candidate Robert La Follette Sr. in 1924.

Results

By county

References

California
1992
United States president